Airor is a hamlet in the peninsula of Knoydart, Lochaber, Highland, on the west coast of Scotland.

It is situated on the north-west coast of Knoydart, and consists of a few houses clustered round Airor Bay, as well as several pre-clearance ruins. The settlement overlooks the Sound of Sleat and the Isle of Skye.

Populated places in Lochaber